Armstrong Laboratory was a research and development organization operated by the United States Air Force Materiel Command. In 1997, the Laboratory was merged into the Air Force Research Laboratory.

The Laboratory was named after Gen Harry G. Armstrong, known as "the father of space medicine."

See also
Virtual fixture, augmented reality system developed at Armstrong Laboratory

References

United States Air Force